Headstock is a part of guitar or similar stringed instrument.

Headstock may also refer to:

 Headstock (mine), the structure above an underground mine shaft
 Headstock (rolling stock), part of a rail vehicle
 Headstock, part of a lathe
 Headstock, the hold on a ring of bells

See also
 Head (disambiguation)